was the twenty-fourth of the sixty-nine stations of the Nakasendō. It is located in the present-day city of Saku, in Nagano Prefecture, Japan.

History
Yawata-shuku is located on the west bank of the Shinano River, just across from Shionada-shuku, the preceding post town. Though these two post towns are located not much more than 500 meters away, Yawata-shuku was able to develop during the Keichō era in the early Edo period. It was a comparatively small post town, but its prosperity came from it serving as a rest area at times when the Shinano River could not be crossed and as a distribution center for rice.

Neighboring post towns
Nakasendō
Shionada-shuku - Yawata-shuku - Mochizuki-shuku

References

Stations of the Nakasendō
Stations of the Nakasendo in Nagano Prefecture